The Torre Velasca (Velasca Tower, in English) is a skyscraper built in the 1950s by the BBPR architectural partnership, in Milan, Italy.
The tower is part of the first generation of Italian modern architecture, while still being part of the Milanese context in which it was born, to which also belongs the Milan Cathedral and the Sforza Castle.

It stands out in the city skyline, made of domes, buildings and other towers. Its structure recalls the Lombard tradition, made of medieval fortresses and towers, each having a massive profile. In such fortresses, the lower parts were always narrower, while the higher parts propped up by wood or stone beams.
As a consequence, the shape of this building is the result of a modern interpretation of the typical Italian medieval castle. At the same time, BBPR in this building satisfied the functional needs of space: narrower surfaces on the ground, wider and more spacious ones on the top floors. The town planning laws, then, imposed specific volumes (depending on the buildings' purpose); in this tower, the latter being the mixed functions of residential and commercial use.

The tower is located in the city centre of Milan, Italy, near the Duomo (Milan Cathedral) and the headquarters of the University of Milan, between the streets "corso di Porta Romana" and "via Larga". One of the exits of the Missori metro station is located right in front of it.

In 2011, the tower was placed under protection as a historic building.

Gallery

See also
List of buildings in Milan

References

Office buildings completed in 1958
Residential buildings completed in 1958
Skyscrapers in Milan
Brutalist architecture in Italy
Modernist architecture in Italy
Residential buildings in Italy
Skyscraper office buildings in Italy